Sound man or Soundman may refer to:
Audio engineer, working on the technical aspects of sound recording
Production sound mixer, responsible for recording all sound recording on set during the filmmaking or television production
Soundman (rank), a former U.S. Navy rank for a sonar technician
Soundman Vol. 1, a studio album by Starboy Entertainment
Sound Man: WWII to MP3, a 2006 documentary on magnetic tape sound recording pioneer, Jack Mullin

See also
Sound Manager, Apple software